30 Rock Original Television Soundtrack is the soundtrack for the NBC television program 30 Rock. The two-disc album consists largely of songs composed by Jeff Richmond, the co-producer and musical director of the show and the husband of the creator, writer, producer, and star, Tina Fey. It includes the score of the series as well as some songs that have been featured in the show's first four seasons. It was released on November 16, 2010 by Relativity Music Group. On November 20, 2010, the cast of 30 Rock did their first ever signing for the soundtrack at the NBC Experience Store at Rockefeller Center. Appearances were made by Tina Fey, Jeff Richmond, Jane Krakowski, Jack McBrayer, John Lutz, Kevin Brown, and Grizz Chapman.

Track listing

References

Soundtrack
Television soundtracks
2010 soundtrack albums